General Ibrahim Baré Maïnassara (May 9, 1949 – April 9, 1999) was a military officer and diplomat in Niger who ruled the country from his seizure of power in 1996 until his assassination during the military coup of April 1999.

Baré Maïnassara, a Maouri, a subgroup of Niger's Hausa ethnic majority, was born in Dogondoutchi in 1949, and pursued a military career. Maïnassara was named Army Chief of Staff in March 1995, under a constitution which had moved Niger from military rule in 1991.

Political conflict
Parliamentary elections in January 1995 resulted in cohabitation between President Mahamane Ousmane and a parliament controlled by his opponents, led by Prime Minister Hama Amadou.
Rivalry between Ousmane and Amadou effectively paralyzed the government, and Maïnassara seized power on January 27, 1996, pointing to the difficult political situation as justification.

Rule of Niger
Under Maïnassara's rule, a new constitution was approved by referendum in May 1996, and a presidential election was held on July 7–8, 1996. Maïnassara took about 52% of the vote, but the election was widely viewed as fraudulent. On the second day of polling he had the electoral commission dissolved and replaced it with another electoral commission; on the same day, he also had the four opposition candidates placed under house arrest, which lasted for two weeks. Maïnassara was sworn in on August 7.

The National Union of Independents for Democratic Renewal (UNIRD) was established in 1996 to support Maïnassara in that year's elections, but subsequently the Rally for Democracy and Progress-Jama'a was established as the ruling party. With the constitution barring presidents from leading parties, Hamid Algabid became leader of the RDP-Jama'a in August 1997.

Local elections were held in February 1999, and in early April the Supreme Court released results which showed the opposition winning more seats than Maïnassara's supporters; the Court also cancelled the results in many areas and ordered elections there to be held again. The opposition called for protests against the cancellation of results on April 8.

Death
On April 9, 1999, Maïnassara was ambushed and shot to death by soldiers, reportedly members of the Presidential Guard, at the airport in the capital city of Niamey as he was going to board a helicopter attempting to flee the country. The circumstances of the killing were not clear; rumors suggested that Maïnassara was attempting to flee the country. Initially his death was officially described as an "unfortunate accident", but this claim was widely considered implausible. Coup leader Daouda Malam Wanké succeeded him as head of state and initiated a political transition that ended with elections late in the year.

The constitution adopted in a July 1999 referendum provides for an amnesty for participants in both the 1996 and 1999 coups. An investigation into Maïnassara's death had begun in June 1999, but following the amnesty it was ended in September. The RDP-Jama'a has demanded an international inquiry into his death in the years since.

References

Presidents of Niger
Assassinated Nigerien politicians
Leaders who took power by coup
Leaders ousted by a coup
1948 births
1999 deaths
Assassinated heads of state
People murdered in Niger
Deaths by firearm in Niger
Rally for Democracy and Progress (Niger) politicians
Nigerien military personnel
Ambassadors of Niger to Algeria
People from Dosso Region